Keith M. Ingram (born April 12, 1955) is an American politician from the state of Arkansas. A member of the Democratic Party, Ingram represents the 24th district in the Arkansas Senate, of which he is the Minority Leader. Ingram's district includes Crittenden County and parts of Cross, Lee, Phillips and St. Francis counties in eastern Arkansas.

He previously represented the 53rd district in the Arkansas House of Representatives for from January 2009 – January 2013 and served as mayor of West Memphis, Arkansas.

Career
While he was Senator-elect, Ingram was selected as the Democrats' Minority Leader to succeed the party's former Majority Leader Robert F. Thompson of Paragould in Greene County in northeastern Arkansas. He considered running for Governor of Arkansas, in the 2014 election, when the incumbent Democrat Mike Beebe was term-limited but did not file for the higher office.

Ingram is a member of National Conference of State Legislatures, the Council of State Governments and the Southern Legislative Conference. With NCSL, he serves on the Law & Criminal Justice Standing Committee and sits on the Annual Meeting Committee for CSG. In addition to serving as 2014 chairman of the Southern Legislative Conference, he sits on the Energy & Environment Committee.

Business career
Ingram currently serves as vice president of Razorback Concrete Company, a family-owned business in West Memphis.

Family
Ingram's father, William K. Ingram, was an Arkansas state senator from 1963 until 1981, while his brother, Kent Ingram, served for nine years in the state Senate.

References

External links
Official Website
Razorback Concrete Company
Arkansas Legislature - Member Profile
 

1955 births
21st-century American politicians
Democratic Party Arkansas state senators
Living people
Mayors of places in Arkansas
Democratic Party members of the Arkansas House of Representatives
People from Crittenden County, Arkansas
People from West Memphis, Arkansas
Place of birth missing (living people)